The Debt Collection is the debut album by The Shortwave Set, released in July 2005 on Independiente Records. The album encompasses what the band described as their "Victorian Funk" period.

Track listing
"Slingshot" (4:00)
"Sven Rokk" (0:40)
"Is it any Wonder?" (4:27)
"Better Than Bad" (2:10)
"Repeat to Fade" (3:51)
"Heap of Other" (0:35)
"Roadside" (3:27)
"Head to Fill" (4:05)
"Figures of 62" (2:39)
"Just goes to Show" (4:07)
"In Your Debt" (7:32)
"Yr Room" (2:45)

References

2005 debut albums
Independiente Records albums
The Shortwave Set albums